is a Japanese politician of the Democratic Party of Japan, a member of the House of Councillors in the Diet (national legislature). A former member of the assembly of Yamaguchi Prefecture, he was elected to the House of Councillors for the first time in 2007.

Fujitani is also an ordained Shin Buddhist priest within Honganji-ha.

References

External links 
 Official website in Japanese.

1937 births
Living people
Members of the House of Councillors (Japan)
Democratic Party of Japan politicians
Jōdo Shinshū Buddhist priests